Cardonald railway station is located in the Cardonald district of Glasgow, Scotland, also serving parts of the Drumoyne neighbourhood located on the opposite side of the M8 motorway which runs adjacent to the railway. The station is managed by ScotRail and is on the Inverclyde Line.

History 
The station opened on 1 July 1843 as Moss Road and closed in 1845. The station was reopened and renamed Cardonald on 1 October 1879.

On 24 March 2008, a woman was hit by a train at Cardonald. She later died of her injuries.

Services 

 2tph to Glasgow Central
 2tph to Gourock

The evening service is:
 1tph  to Wemyss Bay
 1tph  to Gourock
 2tph to Glasgow Central

There is an hourly service each way on Sundays to Glasgow & Gourock.

Footnotes

References 

Butt, R. V. J. (1995). The Directory of Railway Stations. Patrick Stephens Ltd, Sparkford, .

External links 

Railway stations in Glasgow
Former Glasgow and Paisley Joint Railway stations
Railway stations in Great Britain opened in 1843
Railway stations in Great Britain closed in 1845
Railway stations in Great Britain opened in 1879
SPT railway stations
Railway stations served by ScotRail
1843 establishments in Scotland